The Volvo Ailsa B55 was a front-engined double-decker bus chassis manufactured in Scotland by Ailsa, Volvo's British subsidiary in which it owned 75%, from 1974 until 1985.

Versions

The B55 was designed with a front-mounted engine that still allowed a front entrance position suitable for one-person operation. In this sense there was a common goal with the earlier, unsuccessful, Guy Wulfrunian. It was fitted with the Volvo TD70 engine, a compact turbocharged unit of 6.7-litres. The rest of the design was relatively simple, with beam axles and leaf springs. A Self-Changing Gears semi-automatic gearbox was used. It first appeared at the 1973 Scottish Motor Show.

The most popular bodywork was the Alexander AV type, replaced by the R type from the earlier 1980s. The Falkirk based Alexander factory thus meant that the Alexander bodied Ailsa B55s were entirely built in Scotland, a significant factor in securing Scottish orders (notably from the Scottish Bus Group, Strathclyde Passenger Transport Executive and Tayside Regional Council) especially given the ease in securing locally sourced spare parts and repairs.

A prototype low height Ailsa, designated B55-20 (instead of the standard B55-10), was built for Derby Borough Transport in 1975.

In 1977, an improved Mark II version appeared, with two transmission options offered, a Self-Changing Gears pneumocyclic unit and a Voith D851 with retarder. Northern Counties bodied some for Derby Corporation and Cardiff Bus, a total of 35 were also bodied by East Lancs Coachbuilders for Tayside, and a small number were also bodied by Marshall for Strathclyde and Derby Corporation.

The last significant number of Ailsas in service in the UK were operated by Cardiff Bus, who maintained 18 of the type in regular service by 2007 following extensive refurbishment. They were withdrawn at the end of 2007. However, as at February 2014, ten Ailsas remain in service for school work, school contracts and rail replacement with Edwards Coaches of South Wales.

Preservation

There are now around 30 Volvo Ailsas in preservation, with the Glasgow Vintage Vehicle Trust having six. The Sheffield based 388 Group have 1 Van Hool bodied example. The other, A1 Service PSJ 824R now resides at the Glasgow Vintage Vehicle Trust, previously being based in Sheffield. With Tayside being the most prolific buyer of the Ailsa, there are also a significant number in various stages of restoration with Tayside Vintage Vehicle Society, and two preserved examples regularly visit rallies and events throughout the country, WTS 273T and the open top WTS 272T.

A number of Cardiff Bus Volvo Ailsas have been preserved, one such example being NDW412X, owned by the 302 Group.

References

Bibliography
Jack, A.D. (1997). Volvo Bus: 25 Years of Progress. Venture Publications Ltd. .
Booth, Gavin (1983). The British Bus Today and Tomorrow. London: Ian Allan Ltd. .
Townsin, Alan (1985). The British Bus Story - The Late 'Seventies - The Calm Before the Storm. The Transport Publishing Company. .

External links

Vehicles introduced in 1973
Ailsa B55
Double-decker buses
Tri-axle buses
Bus chassis